This is a list of 119 species in the genus Acritus.

Acritus species

 Acritus abundans Cooman, 1932
 Acritus acaroides Marseul, 1856
 Acritus acinus Marseul, 1862
 Acritus alienus Thérond, 1960
 Acritus alluaudi Schmidt, 1895
 Acritus alticola Gomy, 1978
 Acritus alutaceus Thérond, 1961
 Acritus analis J. L. LeConte, 1853
 Acritus angoramensis Gomy, 1977
 Acritus arizonae Horn, 1873
 Acritus atai Gomy, 1984
 Acritus atomus J. L. LeConte, 1853
 Acritus attaphilus Wenzel, 1939
 Acritus australasiae Gomy, 1984
 Acritus bikoi Gomy, 2001
 Acritus bipartitus Lewis, 1888
 Acritus bisulcithorax Cooman, 1936
 Acritus blackburni Gomy, 1984
 Acritus blighi Gomy, 1984
 Acritus caldwelli Gomy, 1984
 Acritus caledoniae Wenzel, 1955
 Acritus caledonicus Gomy, 1981
 Acritus castaneus Lea, 1925
 Acritus cingulidens Marseul, 1879
 Acritus colettae Gomy, 1978
 Acritus cooteri Gomy, 1999
 Acritus copricola Cooman, 1932
 Acritus courtoisi Gomy, 1978
 Acritus deharvengi Gomy, 1981
 Acritus depressus Bousquet and Laplante, 2006
 Acritus discriminatus Thérond, 1973
 Acritus discus J. L. LeConte, 1853
 Acritus dogueti Gomy, 1984
 Acritus dugdalei Gomy, 1983
 Acritus egregius Cooman, 1932
 Acritus eichelbaumi Bickhardt, 1911
 Acritus elgonensis Jeannel and Paulian, 1945
 Acritus erimae Gomy, 1981
 Acritus exiguus (Erichson, 1834)
 Acritus exquisitus Cooman, 1932
 Acritus fidjensis Gomy, 1983
 Acritus fidjicus Gomy, 1983
 Acritus fimetarius (J. E. LeConte, 1844)
 Acritus fuligineus Lewis, 1888
 Acritus gibbipectus Cooman, 1932
 Acritus griffithi Gomy, 1984
 Acritus haedillus Marseul, 1870
 Acritus halmaturinus Lea, 1925
 Acritus hammondi Gomy, 1980
 Acritus helferi Reichardt, 1932
 Acritus helmsi Gomy, 1984
 Acritus herbertfranzi Gomy, 1981
 Acritus hilum Lewis, 1888
 Acritus homoeopathicus Wollaston, 1857
 Acritus hopffgarteni Reitter, 1878
 Acritus ignobilis (Lewis, 1888)
 Acritus indignus Schmidt, 1893
 Acritus inquilinus Lea, 1925
 Acritus insipiens Marseul, 1879
 Acritus italicus Reitter, 1904
 Acritus komai Lewis, 1879
 Acritus kuscheli Gomy, 1984
 Acritus lamberti Gomy, 1994
 Acritus leai Gomy, 1984
 Acritus liliputianus Lewis, 1888
 Acritus loriai Gomy, 1980
 Acritus madagascariensis Schmidt, 1895
 Acritus magnus Cooman, 1935
 Acritus mahnerti Gomy, 1981
 Acritus mandelai Gomy, 2001
 Acritus mateui Gomy, 1988
 Acritus matthewsi Gomy, 1984
 Acritus megaponerae Bickhardt in Brauns, 1914
 Acritus methneri Bickhardt, 1921
 Acritus mexicanus (Lewis, 1888)
 Acritus microsomus Cooman, 1932
 Acritus microtatus Cooman, 1934
 Acritus minutus (Herbst, 1791)
 Acritus muhlei Gomy, 2001
 Acritus mulleri Gomy, 2007
 Acritus multipunctus Bickhardt, 1911
 Acritus nepalensis Gomy, 1976
 Acritus nigricornis (Hoffmann, 1803)
 Acritus novaeguineae Gomy, 1977
 Acritus occidentalis Lea, 1925
 Acritus opimus Cooman, 1947
 Acritus pascuarum Cooman, 1947
 Acritus paulae Gomy, 1980
 Acritus pectinatus Cooman, 1932
 Acritus peculiaris Lewis, 1888
 Acritus pirata Gomy, 1978
 Acritus poggi Gomy, 1980
 Acritus prosternalis (Deane, 1932)
 Acritus punctisternus Wenzel and Dybas, 1941
 Acritus quadristriatus Lewis, 1888
 Acritus quilleroui Gomy, 1984
 Acritus rugosus Bickhardt, 1911
 Acritus schmidti Wenzel, 1955
 Acritus serratus Burgeon, 1939
 Acritus shirozui Hisamatsu, 1965
 Acritus strigipennis Bickhardt, 1912
 Acritus strigosus J. L. LeConte, 1853
 Acritus substriatus Marseul, 1856
 Acritus subtilissimus Schmidt, 1893
 Acritus sulcatellus Cooman, 1935
 Acritus tasmaniae Lewis, 1892
 Acritus tataricus Reitter, 1878
 Acritus tazekae Gomy, 1980
 Acritus teaboomae Gomy, 1976
 Acritus tenuis Marseul, 1856
 Acritus tropicus Lea, 1925
 Acritus tuberculatus Wenzel and Dybas, 1941
 Acritus tuberisternus Cooman, 1932
 Acritus udege Gomy and Tishechkin, 1993
 Acritus vacheri Cooman, 1932
 Acritus vaulogeri Cooman, 1935
 Acritus wenzeli Gomy, 1981
 Acritus werneri Gomy, 1981
 Acritus wokanensis Marseul, 1879

References